Lives in Danger is a 1926 German silent adventure film directed by Karl Gerhardt and starring Luciano Albertini, Ruth Weyher, and Raimondo Van Riel.

The film's sets were designed by the art director Robert A. Dietrich.

Cast
 Luciano Albertini as Luciano
 Ruth Weyher as Eveline
 Raimondo Van Riel as Emilio Reval
 Anna Gorilowa
 Georgette von Platty

References

Bibliography
 Gerhard Lamprecht. Deutsche Stummfilme, Volume 8.

External links

1926 films
Films of the Weimar Republic
German silent feature films
Films directed by Karl Gerhardt
1926 adventure films
German adventure films
Bavaria Film films
Silent adventure films
1920s German films
1920s German-language films